Yuri Yakovlev (born 22 November 1957) is the president of Lokomotiv Yaroslavl, a Russian professional ice hockey team playing in the Kontinental Hockey League (KHL).

References

Lokomotiv Yaroslavl
Living people
1957 births
Russian ice hockey players